Konami Collector's Series: Arcade Advanced, known in Europe as Konami Collector's Series: Arcade Classics, is a compilation video game created by Konami. It was first released on March 22, 2002 for the Game Boy Advance. A version was also released as a plug & play by Majesco Entertainment.

Games
Arcade Advanced is a compilation of six popular Konami games from the 1980s: Rush'n Attack, Frogger, Gyruss, Time Pilot, Scramble, and Yie Ar Kung-Fu. The games themselves are very accurate ports, with some minor exceptions. Four of the six games feature a two player mode which can be played both with and without a second cartridge, but having a second cartridge offers additional gameplay benefits. The famous Konami Code can also be used to enhance each of the games.

Frogger
Frogger is ported accurately except for the title screen theme song (in order to avoid copyright problems for using the children's song Inu no Omawarisan), and the score and lives display. It has a two player mode with a second orange frog that uses updated graphics. These graphics can be unlocked in the single player mode of Frogger by entering the Konami code at the title screen. Also the "skull and crossbones" symbol when the frog died have been shorten to a half-second, making it hard to see.

Scramble
Scramble is ported accurately except the score and lives display has been altered and the Konami code allows for updated graphics, the choice of three ships with different abilities and music during gameplay. There is no two player mode.

Gyruss
Gyruss is ported accurately except the score and lives display has been altered and the Konami code allows the player to play three additional very difficult stages of the game in a black hole and unlock a permanent double ship afterwards for the rest of the game.

Time Pilot
Time Pilot is ported accurately except the score and lives display has been altered, and entering the Konami code allows for a sixth era to be playable at the end of each cycle through time called 1,000,000,000 BC in which the player must shoot pterodactyls. The game can shoot normally after entering the Konami code but it is also possible to hold down the fire button and after a pause the ship will start to shoot infinite bullets without having to press the fire button over and over again. There is also a two player mode where the players play on separate fields and try to rack up the highest score. If the two player mode is played with one cartridge, enemies appear in groups of three; if it is played with two enemies appear in groups of five.

Yie Ar Kung-Fu
Yie Ar Kung-Fu is ported accurately except the score and graphics display is altered, there are no voice samples, the hit detection is improved, and the Konami code can be used to fight two extra fighters in a third gauntlet that is called Hot Fighting History, the same as the first Gauntlet but features a new background in a bamboo forest. There is a two player vs mode which presumably allows for gameplay as all of the fighters, even Feedle, and if playing with one cartridge only one background can be used but if playing with two cartridges both (or all three if the Konami code is inputted) can be used.

Rush'n Attack
Rush'n Attack is ported accurately except the score and lives display has been altered, the A button is used to jump (though up is still used to climb ladders), and the Konami code unlocks two stages exclusive to this version (Train and Hangar). These stages have new graphics on par with the arcade game and their backgrounds are of better quality. However the biggest change is the addition of a two player co-op versus mode that can be played both with one and two cartridges and allows the players to go through the stages together, each trying to get a better score.

Reception 

Konami Collector's Series: Arcade Advanced received "generally favorable" reviews, according to review aggregator Metacritic.

GameSpot noted that while the graphics and sound were drab by contemporary standards, for the most part, they were faithful recreations of the original games. IGN lamented the lack of options and customization but praised the effort that went into the port in iterating upon the original games while preserving their appeal.

See also
Enhanced remake
Konami 80's Arcade Gallery - Also titled Konami Arcade Classics and Konami 80's AC Special.
Konami Classics Series: Arcade Hits - Also titled Konami Arcade Classics in Europe.
 Konami Antiques MSX Collection
 Konami Classics for Xbox 360
List of Konami games

Notes

References

External links
Official English website, Japanese

2002 video games
Game Boy Advance games
Game Boy Advance-only games
Konami video game compilations